The Animals of Farthing Wood is a British animated series commissioned by the European Broadcasting Union between 1993 and 1995, and is based on the series of books written by English author Colin Dann. It was produced by Telemagination, based in London, and La Fabrique, based in Montpellier in France, but also aired in other European countries. The first countries to air the series were Norway, Germany, The Netherlands, Belgium, Ireland, Italy, and the United Kingdom, in January 1993.

On 3 October 2016, Network Distributing released all three series of The Animals of Farthing Wood onto a DVD box set. This was the first time that all episodes had been released in English as an official and complete set. As of 2021, it is now available for digital purchase in the UK on Amazon Prime Video.

Synopsis
The television series followed the basic plots of the series of books, although certain elements were changed.

The first series followed the animals of Farthing Wood, who were forced to flee their homes after humans started destroying the wood to build suburban tract houses. Led by Fox, and guided by Toad, the animals left Farthing Wood on a journey to White Deer Park, a nature reserve where they would be protected. The second and third series followed the relationships between the Farthing Wood animals, the White Deer Park animals and outsiders, particularly a blue fox named Scarface, his mate Lady Blue and cub Ranger.

The episodes were made in both the UK and France. Because of this, in Series 1 traffic is seen driving on the right hand carriageway of the motorway. However, they are briefly seen in Series 3 driving on the left hand side. Other than this, the location is generally kept ambiguous, apart from a brief moment in Series 2 when a gravestone is visible with French writing on it.

When the series aired in the United States, two versions were shown, the UK version which was shown on select television stations, and a new version released on home video titled Journey Home: The Animals of Farthing Wood. The home video version saw some of the voices changed, for example, the role of Fox was replaced by Ralph Macchio, along with added songs as well.

Episodes

Cast
 Jeremy Barrett as Mr. Rabbit, Scarface, Mole, Bold, Friendly, Hollow, Mossy, Hurkel, Measley, Mr. Shrew, and others.
 Rupert Farley as Fox, Mr. Hare, Mr. Pheasant, Plucky, Trey, Fido, Brat, and others.
 Jon Glover as Scarface, Ranger, The Warden, and others.
 Sally Grace as Weasel, Charmer, and others.
 Tessa Peake-Jones as Tawny Owl.
 Stacy Jefferson as Vixen, Adder, Kestrel, Mrs. Hare, Mrs. Rabbit, Shadow, and others.
 Pamela Keevilkral as Dash, Cleo, Speedy, Whisper, Mrs. Squirrel, Mrs. Hedgehog, and others.
 Ron Moody as Badger, Toad, Whistler, Bully, Spike, Rollo, Mr. Hedgehog, Mr. Vole, Mr. Mouse, The Great White Stag, and others.
 Maria Warburg as Whisper (Audiobook only)
 Peter Woodthorpe as Whistler, Toad, and The Great White Stag (Audiobook only)
 Timothy Bateson as Measley, Fox, Trey, and others (Audiobook only)
Fiona Reid as Weasel and Adder (US dub only)

Fox, the leader of the Animals of Farthing Wood, was voiced by Rupert Farley in the UK and Ireland version but in the US home video version he was played by Ralph Macchio.

In France, Germany, Italy, Norway, and Sweden the cast included the following:

Buzz Books
These are based upon the characters in the television series. Some parts had happened differently.

 "Farewell to the Wood" (based upon The Wood in Danger)
 "The Adventure Begins" (based upon The Journey Begins)
 "Fire" (based upon Through the Fire and Water)
 "A New Friend" (based upon Friend in Need)
 "Heroes" (based upon Whistler's Quarry)
 "The Silent Field" (based upon A Deathly Calm)
 "The Storm Shelter" (based upon Pandemonium)
 "Journey's End" (based upon So Near and Yet So Far)
 "A New Home" (based upon A Hero's Welcome, Winter, and Survival)
 "Badger in Danger" (based upon Winter, and Survival)
 "Unwelcome Visitors" (based upon New Enemies)
 "Spring Awakening" (based upon Home is Where the Heart Is)
 "Bold" (based upon The Feud Begins)
 "Trouble in the Park" (based upon Like Father, Like Son, Narrow Escapes, and Shadows)
 "Showdown" (based upon Blood is Thicker Than Water)
 "Peace" (based upon Reconciliation)
 "Strangers in the Park" (based upon Comings and Goings)
 "The Weasels' Adventure" (based upon The Missing Fox's Friend, Tiffs and Tempers, and The Long Tailed Visitor)
 "To the Rescue" (based upon The Missing Fox's Friend, Adventure for the Birds, and Scared Silly by Snakes)
 "The Rat Spy" (based upon The Long Tailed Visitor and The Mole Game)

Adventures of Fox
Appears last on the Greatest BBC Children's Video ever along with Fireman Sam, Pingu, Spider, William's Wish Wellingtons, Clangers, Nursery Rhyme Time, Noddy's Toyland Adventures, Funnybones, Hairy Jeremy, and The Little Polar Bear. It has clips from the following episodes:
 Beginning and end of The Wood in Danger (Loggers attack the Wood, Owl informed about the pond filled in, Assembly)
 Beginning of The Journey Begins (Leaving the Wood)
 End of Snare for the Unwary (Kestrel spots river, Animals cross River, Fox and Badger hit by driftwood)
 Beginning of Who Shall Wear the Crown? (Badger found in reeds, Kestrel loses Fox, Animals move on)
 Some beginning and Middle of New Friends, Old Enemies (Fox arrives at Town, Fox put onto truck, Fox meets Vixen)
 Some parts of Friend in Need (parts with Hunting, Meeting Big Owl, Searching, Fox Hunt and the ending)

Merchandise
Apart from books and videos, there was also a Farthing Wood CD-ROM game that was released in October 1996, and in the mid-1990s, a 130-part magazine for children entitled "Farthing Wood Friends" was also developed. Audio tapes recapping the first two seasons were released, with the story being told to young fox cubs by several of the cast who would also debate the events and mimic some of the other characters.

There are also three TV tie-in books available, one to accompany each of the TV series:
The Animals of Farthing Wood links with Series 1.
The Further Adventures of The Animals of Farthing Wood links with Series 2.
The Animals of Farthing Wood – Spirit of Survival links with Series 3.
These follow the same storylines, but are presented in a comic-strip style.

Watered-down versions of episode storylines were also featured as a running story in 'Farthing Wood Friends', illustrated using photographic stills from the series. Between magazine coverages of second and third series episodes, abridgements of Colin Dann's original stories were used to fill the void, entitled 'Tales From Farthing Wood'. Another book adaptation of the running story employed for series one was released by Ted Smart Publishing, with illustrations by Stuart Trotter.

Episode stories were also abridged for Buzz Books, Reed Children's Books' range of storybooks based on popular children's characters. The Farthing Wood stories in this range started with five books to begin with, then steadily expanded to cover the remainder of series one and series two. Illustrations were produced by William Heinemann in favour of using stills from the series.

Hornby, known mainly for its model railways, produced collectable figurines of the series ensemble, released in batches or 'presentation packs'. They were as follows:

1st Series: Fox, Badger, Mole, Weasel, Toad & Owl

2nd Series: White Stag, Scarface, Kestrel, Adder, Whistler & Rabbit

3rd Series: Bully, Vixen, Plucky, Fido, Cleo, Rollo, Measly, Speedy, Hollow, Hurkel, Dash & Sinuous

The characters were also released in twin packs and later in the run, Hornby produced compatible play-scenes. Early in the run, almost simultaneous with the first series being shown in the UK, they released plush toys of Badger, Fox and Mole. Although these were rare finds in toyshops, they were the subject of a running promotion in 'Farthing Wood Friends', enabling readers to win them.

Despite the show being very popular, the series did not see any form of DVD release until 2009, with the episodes on VHS hard to find up to then (in particular the last two collections). However, there had been an increase in unofficial DVDs available on eBay.

Series 1 came out in France in February 2009.

Series 1 was released in Germany on 25 September 2009, Series 2 was released in Germany on 27 May 2011, and Series 3 was released in Germany on 24 February 2012. The German DVD releases offer both English and German audio options.

On 3 October 2016, Network released all three series of The Animals of Farthing Wood onto a DVD Box Set. This is the first time all episodes have been released in English as an official & complete set. (http://networkonair.com/shop/2553-animals-of-farthing-wood-the-the-complete-series.html) Brownee Bear Productions also own the licence for this shows. The licence was done thru agreements of the creators.

Differences between the books and the series
There are a number of differences between the books and the television series, most notably the changing of a number of characters from male to female. This included Adder, Weasel, Owl, and Kestrel, who retained the markings of a male kestrel. Owl had also been known as Tawny Owl in the books. In addition to this, the books featured a family of lizards who became the newts of the television series. New characters like the Shrews, Hurkel and Measley were introduced. Plucky is also changed from being Bold's grandson to his son. There are females that are males now. They are Sinuous, The Big Owl and Hollow. The Fieldmice are now known as the Mice. Holly is now known as Hollow.

Minor plot changes also exist, such as the order of the pheasant's deaths, the deaths of Badger and Moley, and the motives of certain characters. Scarface has a different reason for attacking the Farthing Animals and Bold leaves the Park after an argument with his father, rather than to find a mate as he does in the books. In contrast to Badger's death, Toad and Mossy survive the television series, the former befriending Spike, the rat who killed Mossy and was killed himself by Adder in the books. The cause of Sinuous' death was also changed. Of the rats, Brat originally returned to the sewers instead of being killed by Sinuous, while Bully had his tail bitten off by Cleo rather than being killed by Vixen. Also in the end of the book Season 3 was based on, Battle for the Park, Dash is the one who tells the others that White Deer Park has merged with another reserve giving more space for the animals to live, in Season 3, it's instead Trey who tells them this.

Scarface and his tribe were rival red foxes in the books. His mate was not also named in the books and her personality is not so developed. Too many red foxes would have been confusing for viewers, so the animators made Scarface and his family distinguishable by making them "blue foxes" (more commonly referred to as "silver foxes", a melanistic color morph of the red fox). Speedy was also unnamed. There are also one-episode characters that didn't appear in the books such as The Red Squirrels, Stoat and Scragg the Rat who is killed in his one-time appearance.

The only main plotline that is left out of the series is the plot of The Siege of White Deer Park, in which the character known as 'The Beast' (a big wild cat) attacks the park, causing further trouble for the animals' survival. The storyline of this book is presumably removed because of too much horror and peril themes and the sub-plots that occur in the book (such as Badger mistaking Mossy for Mole) are broken down into small plot changes in the other book storylines for the series.

Credits
Based on the Books by: Colin Dann
Written by: Alan Case, Steve Walker, Sue Butterworth, Jenny McDade, Gordon Harrison, Elphin Lloyd-Jones, Valerie Georgeson
Adapted by: Steve Walker
Music composed & arranged by: Detlev Kühne
Theme Music composed and arranged by: Detlev Kühne
Recorded by: Kölner Rundfunkorchester
Directors: Elphin Lloyd-Jones, Philippe LeClerc
Assistant Director: Emile Bourget
Animation Director: Alan Simpson
Character Designs: Elphin Lloyd-Jones, Philippe LeClerc, Patrick Michel
Storyboard: Gordon Harrison, Jean Francois Laguionie, Claude Aufrere
Backgrounds: Ian Henderson, Richard Mithonard, Valerie Carmona
Layouts: Sue Butterworth, Gordon Harrison, Ted Pettengell, Trevor Ricketts, Patrick Michel, Gerard Kiszel, Christian Ragoust
Animation: Thomas Barker, Monica Brutton, Alison de Vere, Andy Eraclerus, Christopher Evans, Joan Freestone, Tony Guy, Peter Hale, Arthur Humberstone, Simon Loxton, Fraser MacLean, Charlie MacRae, Janet Nunn, John Perkins, Mike Pocock, Paul Stone, Rosemary Welch, José Xavier
Key Animators: Chris Clarke, Gary Hender, Nathalie Biston, Marian Brooks, Valerie Pouyanne, Jean Francois Galataud, Monica Moinar, Lea Movement
Assistant Animators: Philippe Archer, Jean-Yves Regnault, Laurence Commeyras, Isabelle Pouyanne, Didier Chenu, Catherine Halvic, Muriel Chevallier, Sega Favre, Sylvia Bottiau, Sim Lignon
Trace & Paint: Audrey Hammond, Pat Arthy, Pete Arthy, Lynda Marmont, Chris Jones, Ross Marks, Sharon Martins, Becky New, Vivienne Redmond, Jenni Steers, Dominique Lenoble, Clarie Dame, Nancy Rey, Frederic Jaubert, Suzy Kopp, Sophie Beltran, Brigitte Boursereau, Rodney Crofton, Carole Dorange, Nathalie Finiels, Cathy Gentric, Isabelle Landmann, Claire Larnelle, Cathy Rigall, Maria Stockman, Mireille Valentin 
Checking: Ann Kotch, Janine Arthy, Isabelle Perrichon, Andrew Ryder
Rostrum Camera: Chris Williams, Anthony Hagen, Jacques Armand, Yves Francon, Jean Paul Rossard
Software: Animo Cambridge Animation Systems
Production Supervisor: Jean-Paul Gaspari
Production Coordinator: Dominique Edmond-Marlette
Production Accountants: Helmut Breuer, Philippe Marteaux
Editing: Theresa Plummer-Andrews, John Daniels, Ken Morgan, Tom Oliver
Special Effects: Stephan Hartl, Malcolm Beattie
Picture Editor: Fiona Keene
Videotape Services: Video Time
Line Test Camera: Plaza Synchron
Dialogue Editor: John Daniels, Hilary Daniels, Hans-Peter Kaufman
Track Readers: Otto Sander, Ulli Philipp, Tilly Lauenstein, Martin Semmelrogge, Helmut Ruge, Wichart V. Roell, Karin Kernke, Franz-Josef Steffens, Stephan Schwartz, Marion Martinzen, Manfred Lehmann, Peter Fricke, Benno Hoffmann, Thomas Reiner, Horst Sachtleben, Michael Habeck, Tommy Piper, Arne Elsholtz, Ingeborg Lapsien, Stefan Orlac
Associate Producer: Wolfgang Wegmann
Producer: John M. Mills
Production: A Martin Gates Production in association with Telemagination (London), Praxinos (Montpeller) for the BBC Enterprises
EBU Coordinator: Marie-Claire Vionnet
Executive Producers: Siegmund Grewenig, Theresa Plummer-Andrews
Film Laboratories: European Cineman, Television Year
Copyrighted in 1992, 1993 and 1995 by the European Broadcasting Union (of Europe)

References

External links

The Animals of Farthing Wood at Toonhound
The Animals of Farthing Wood at the European Broadcasting Union
The Animals of Farthing Wood Fanlisting
Telemagination

1993 British television series debuts
1995 British television series endings
1990s British animated television series
1993 French television series debuts
1995 French television series endings
1990s French animated television series
British children's animated adventure television series
British children's animated drama television series
British television shows based on children's books
French children's animated adventure television series
French children's animated drama television series
French television shows based on children's books
English-language television shows
BBC Television shows
BBC children's television shows
TVNZ 2 original programming
YTV (Canadian TV channel) original programming
Television shows based on British novels
Animated television series about foxes
Animated television series about frogs
Television series about snakes
Television shows about death
1990s British children's television series